Stephen Stills 2 is the second solo album by Stephen Stills, released on Atlantic Records in 1971. It peaked at number eight on the Billboard 200 and was certified as a gold record by the RIAA. Two singles were released from the album, both just missing the Top 40 on the Billboard Hot 100 chart: "Change Partners" peaked at number 43; while "Marianne" peaked at number 42.

Background and recording
After the break up of CSNY, being busted on a swathe of possession charges, overdosing on pills, and his loss of Rita Coolidge to Graham Nash, Stills became extremely prolific and wrote and recorded 23 songs for this album. It was originally intended to be a double album that included songs such as "Johnny's Garden", "Love Story", "So Begins the Task", "The Treasure", "Colorado", "Fallen Eagle", and "Rock and Roll Crazies". However, Atlantic executive Ahmet Ertegun insisted it be a single album.

Stills was influenced by the recent success of bands with horn sections, including Chicago, and Blood, Sweat, & Tears, and introduced the Memphis Horns on this album and the tour to support, despite its mixed reaction from fans.

This was the first album he recorded at Criteria Studios in Miami from February to March 1971 with the Albert Brothers, who he used for the majority of his 1970s work. Ahmet Ertegun had suggested Miami as to get away from all the drama on the West Coast. Stills started work on the album while his first album had only just been released a month prior. This album was released only six months after his first album.

It was during this time that Stills would hold marathon recording sessions for three months while recording the album, employing two teams of studio engineers working shifts around the clock just to keep up with him. Jerry Garcia recalled Stills flew him to Miami for a week to record pedal steel on "Change Partners" saying "I did sessions at the weirdest hours... the way he worked in the studio was totally crazy, but at the time he was really happening. He just accumulated endless tracks." Engineer Howard Albert recalled "he turned up to his very first session at 2 am on the very night he landed in town. We didn't know he was coming and we were in the middle of making a Johnny Winter album. Lucky for us, there were two of us because Stephen wanted to start straight away".

Content 
The lyrics were printed on the inside of the gatefold cover in red, on a background photograph of Stephen Stills in a mountainous outdoor setting pointing into the distance. There were numerous errors in the original printing of the lyrics, which necessitated that Atlantic issue the album with a large sticker affixed to the shrink wrap of the back cover with the corrections to the lyrics. Later editions of the album had corrected lyrics inside the gatefold and thus did not include a correction sticker on the album.

"Singin' Call" which had been demoed for Déjà Vu was written about Rita Coolidge. Stills was inspired to write "Word Game" after watching a documentary film about apartheid and musically influenced by Bob Dylan's "It's Alright, Ma (I'm Only Bleeding)". "Fishes and Scorpions", which featured Stills and Eric Clapton on guitars, was recorded during the recording sessions for his first album. "Relaxing Town", expresses disconnect with the narrator wanting to settle down in a relaxing town away from the revolution. It contains a reference to Jerry Rubin, one of the Chicago Seven, and Mayor Daley.

Aftermath 
Stills had already performed "Bluebird Revisited" on tour with Crosby, Stills, Nash, & Young in 1969 including at Woodstock.

Stills undertook a 52-date tour called The Memphis Horns Tour in the summer of 1971 to support the album; members included the Memphis Horns along with CSNY bass player Calvin Samuel and CSNY drummer Dallas Taylor. The tour encompassed a variety of formats and moods from solo acoustic confessionals and folk duets to rock anthems and big band R&B. The tour was not very well-received, with some blaming Stills' lack of confidence. On the opening night in Seattle only 3,000 people attended out 15,000 as the Boeing factory had just closed. With this fact and his recent split from Coolidge severely knocking his confidence, Stills started drinking, hence the tour's nickname "the Drunken Horns Tour". However, Stills has also said there were good nights like the night he sold out Madison Square Garden, though this was overshadowed by the Concert for Bangladesh just a day later, for which Stills had donated his stage, sound, lighting system and production manager, despite not even being invited to play. Also a roadie died on stage after plummeting from the rigging at MSG, then a few days later Stills fell off a motorcycle and finished the tour in a brace requiring David Crosby to help him finish the last few dates of the tour. Stills had been promising a massive tour since his first album saying it would be 'a real road show - the biggest since Ray Charles hit the stage', however early on in the tour he commented saying it was a marathon where you watch the singer bleed trying to sing 18 songs in a row. Due to these issues Stills has a negative perception of the tour. It was during this tour that Stills met with the Flying Burrito Brothers' Chris Hillman and the beginnings of Manassas took place.

He later re-recorded two songs from this album: "Singin' Call" for his 1991 album Stills Alone, and "Word Game" for the 2013 album by blues supergroup The Rides. He also reworked the song "Know You Got to Run", adding on a chorus to change it into "Open Up", a song which he never recorded himself, but instead gave to REO Speedwagon, who recorded it for their album Ridin' the Storm Out.

By 1974, according to Rolling Stone magazine the album had sold an estimated 600,000 copies.

Reception

Contemporary reception was mixed to positive with John Mendelsohn of Rolling Stone describing Stills as "a solid second-rate artist who so many lower-middlebrows insist on believing is actually first-rate" and his post-Buffalo Springfield work collectively as "fifth-rate self-indulgence". Of Stephen Stills 2 specifically he commented, "the words to Stills 2 are alternately trivial, cloyingly self-important, and downright offensive, the music is decidedly lackluster and undistinguished, and the production of the whole shebang is so distant from up to snuff that one is hard pressed to get much impression at all of the playing of the latter."

In a positive review Nick Logan reviewing for the NME, 1971 said "The heartfelt plea to know the reason for the pain in 'Open Secret', among the set's best tracks, saves itself from tumbling into a self pitying abyss because the 'pain' is not specified but universal".

Robert Christgau, 1971 said  "Stills is of course detestable, the ultimate rich hippie--arrogant, self-pitying, sexist, shallow. Unfortunately, he's never quite communicated all this on a record, but now he's approaching his true level. Flashes of brilliant ease remain--the single, "Marianne," is very nice, especially if you don't listen too hard to the lyrics—but there's also a lot of stuff on the order of an all-male chorus with jazzy horns singing "It's disgusting" in perfect tuneful unison, and straight, I swear. Keep it up, SS—it'll be a pleasure to watch you fail."

In a positive review Bill McAllister, writing in August 1971 for Record Mirror, called the album "more personal" than his first due to the fewer number of other musicians, and "absorbing while reaching out further, which it should". He summarised his review by saying "Like his 'Bluebird', Stephen Stills knows how to fly".

Track listing

Personnel
 Stephen Stillsvocals, guitars, keyboards, bass guitar
 Nils Lofgrenguitars, keyboards, backing vocals 
 Eric Claptonelectric guitar on "Fishes and Scorpions"
 Paul Harris, Billy Preston, Dr. Johnkeyboards
 Calvin "Fuzzy" Samuelsbass
 Conrad Isidore, Dallas Taylordrums
 Gasper Lawal, Rocky Dijoncongas
 David Crosby, Henry Diltz, Fred Neil as "Fearless Freddy"backing vocals
Jerry Garciapedal steel guitar on "Change Partners" (uncredited)

The Memphis Horns:
 Roger Hopps, Wayne Jacksontrumpets
 Jack Helmtrombone
 Sidney George, Ed Logan, Andrew Lovetenor saxophone
 James Mitchell, Floyd Newmanbaritone saxophone
Technical Personnel
 Stephen Stills - Production, arranged and conducted
 Bill Halverson - Production, engineer
 Richard Digby Smith, The Albert Brothers - assistants
 Gary Burden - Art direction / Design
 Henry Diltz - Photography
 The Geffen Roberts Management Company - direction

Charts 

Album

Year-end charts

Singles

Certification

Memphis Horns Tour 
The Stephen Stills 1971 North American Tour was a concert tour by American musician Stephen Stills, informally known as the Memphis Horns or Drunken Horns tour. It was in support of Stephen Stills 2, and the first solo tour of his career. Members included the Memphis Horns along with CSNY bass player Calvin Samuel and CSNY drummer Dallas Taylor. All concerts were in 1971 and in the United States. The Madison Square Garden show  was professionally recorded and filmed for a future release, as seen and said on an episode of The Old Grey Whistle Test where Stills plays a live version of "Go Back Home". Two songs recorded here were also used on his Carry On box set - "Find The Cost Of Freedom", and "Do For the Others" featuring Steven Fromholz.  It was during this tour he played to 20,000 fans at the Los Angeles Sports Arena, as mentioned in the Manassas song 'Don't Look At My Shadow', released in 1972.

Personnel

 Stephen Stillsvocal, guitar, keyboards
 Steven Fromholzguitar, vocals
 Paul Harriskeyboards
 Calvin "Fuzzy" Samuelsbass guitar
 Dallas Taylordrums
 Joe Lalapercussion
 The Memphis Hornshorn section (Wayne Jackson, Roger Hopps, Jack Hale, Andrew Love, Sidney George, Floyd Newman)

Tour Setlist

This is the setlist from the show at the Los Angeles Forum, August 18, 1971.

All songs written by Stephen Stills, except where noted.

 "Rock and Roll Woman"
 "Questions"
 "Helplessly Hoping"
 "Fishes and Scorpions"
 "Go Back Home"
 "Love the One You're With"
 "Black Queen"
 "Change Partners"
 "Know You Got to Run" (Stills, John Hopkins)
 "Word Game"
 "Do for the Others"
 "I'd Have to Be Crazy"  (Steven Fromholz)
 "Texas Train Ride" (Steven Fromholz)
 "Jesus Gave Love Away For Free"
 "You Don't Have to Cry"
 "49 Bye-Byes/For What It's Worth"
 "Ecology Song"
 "Open Secret"
 "Lean On Me Baby" (Wayne Jackson)
 "Bluebird Revisited"
 "Cherokee"
 "How Long"
 "Find the Cost of Freedom"

References

1971 albums
Stephen Stills albums
Atlantic Records albums